Joe Tshupula (born 15 May 1972) is a Belgian–Congolese football director who is the head of the  Academie de Football Nord in Mauritius.

Early life

Emigrating to Belgium aged ten, Tshupula was not linked to any team until he was 15 due to not knowing of any local outfit.

Mauritius

Succeeding Fidy Rasoanaivo as the AS Port-Louis 2000 coach in 2012, Tshupula was put in to handle Cercle de Joachim the next year, spurring them to 20 points in the first half of 2013-14 and capturing that season's trophy, repeating the success in 2014-15 before stepping down to spend more tome with his family. Interested in handling the Mauritius national team, the Belgian worked with Frenchman Alain Happe as assistant by September 2015, before taking his place and steering the young team to 142nd place on the world rankings, their furthest position since May 2007, by June the next year despite failing to qualify for the 2017 Africa Cup of Nations with two draws as well as two defeats in Group H, giving in to Rwanda 0-5 their last game. However, when Mauritius were bettered by Comoros and they failed to reach the 2019 Africa Cup of Nations, there was speculation about the former frontman's dismissal, finally resigning in 2017 after getting bettered by Angola 3-2, with Brazilian Francisco Filho taking his place.

About football in Mauritius, the Kinshasa native stated that it was more relaxed, not as tactical, and was more of a recreation than a job despite the league being professional, comparing it to the Belgian promotion. In addition, he believes that there is potential among young Mauritian footballers and that the national selection can qualify for the Africa Cup of Nations in the future.

Personal life

Able to understand and speak Creole,

Has a wife and a son who live with him in Mauritius.

References

External links 
 Carrière mouvementée 
 «Louvain nous avait motivés» 
 at Soccerway

Mauritius national football team managers
Living people
Expatriate football managers in France
Expatriate football managers in the Democratic Republic of the Congo
Expatriate footballers in France
Belgian expatriate sportspeople in England
Expatriate footballers in England
A.F.C. Tubize players
Belgian expatriate football managers
Gazélec Ajaccio players
Le Havre AC players
Association football forwards
1972 births
Expatriate football managers in Mauritius
Belgian people of Democratic Republic of the Congo descent
Belgian expatriate sportspeople in France
Kidderminster Harriers F.C. players
Belgian football managers
Belgian footballers
Belgian expatriate footballers
Sportspeople from Kinshasa
Belgian expatriate sportspeople in Mauritius